Lowcountry cuisine is the cooking traditionally associated with the South Carolina Lowcountry and the Georgia coast. While it shares features with Southern cooking, its geography, economics, demographics, and culture pushed its culinary identity in a different direction from regions above the Fall Line.

Description
With its diversity of seafood from the coastal estuaries, its concentration of wealth in Charleston and Savannah, and a vibrant African cuisine influence, Lowcountry cooking has strong parallels with New Orleans and Cajun cuisine.

The lowcountry includes the coastal regions of South Carolina and Georgia. There is a difference of opinion as to what exactly the South Carolina Lowcountry encompasses. The term is most frequently used to describe the coastal area of South Carolina that stretches from Pawleys Island, South Carolina to the confluence of the Savannah River at the Georgia state line. More generous accounts argue that the region extends further north and west, including all of the Atlantic coastal plain of South Carolina and Georgia. The geography is a critical factor in distinguishing the region's culinary identity from interior areas of the South.

The rich estuary system provides an abundance of shrimp, fish, crabs, and oysters that were not available to non-coastal regions prior to refrigeration. The marshlands of South Carolina also proved conducive to growing rice, and that grain became a major part of the everyday diet.

Foods that are traditionally part of Lowcountry cuisine

Appetizers, soups, and salads
 Cooter soup (Turtle soup)
 She-crab soup
 Sweet potato and crab soup
 Gumbo
 Brunswick stew

Meat and seafood

 Catfish stew
 Lowcountry boil (known as "Frogmore stew" in South Carolina)
 Country captain
 Shrimp and grits
 Shrimp kedgeree
 Oyster roast
 Crab cake

Rice
 Charleston red rice
 Perlau or chicken bog
 Salmon and rice

Sides

 Hoppin' John
 Fried cabbage
 Baked macaroni and cheese

See also
 Cuisine of the Southern United States
 Vertamae Grosvenor
 Marsh Hen Mill, in South Carolina, selling grits from heirloom grains and other local products

References

 Taylor, John Martin. Hoppin'John's Lowcountry Cooking. Houghton Mifflin Company, 2000.
 The Junior League of Charleston. Charleston Receipts. Wimmer Brothers, 1993.

External links
 Carolina Cuisine

 
South Carolina culture
Georgia (U.S. state) culture